Lukáš Krejčík (born October 15, 1990) is a Czech professional ice hockey player currently playing for LHK Jestřábi Prostějov in the Chance Liga.

He made his Czech Extraliga debut with BK Mladá Boleslav during the 2009–10 Czech Extraliga season. He also played for HC Bílí Tygři Liberec and PSG Berani Zlín.

References

External links

1990 births
Living people
HC Benátky nad Jizerou players
HC Bílí Tygři Liberec players
Czech ice hockey forwards
LHK Jestřábi Prostějov players
BK Mladá Boleslav players
People from Nymburk
HC Slavia Praha players
PSG Berani Zlín players
Sportspeople from the Central Bohemian Region